The Salmon River is a small river in the Township of Langley in the Lower Mainland region of British Columbia, Canada, flowing northwest then northeast to enter Bedford Channel, which separates McMillan Island from Fort Langley, which is just southwest.

The river is one of the only fish stock sustaining streams remaining in the Metro Vancouver area.

History
The Salmon River was an important route for First Nations peoples and later settlers.  It was used for trade and transportation, connecting the Fort Langley settlers and indigenous peoples with Mud Bay and the Straight of Georgia via a portage to the Nicomekl River.  The river and its watershed provided salmon for use in trade and fostered the establishment of a prosperous community in the vicinity of its junction with the Fraser River.

See also
Salmon River (disambiguation)

References

Langley, British Columbia (district municipality)
Rivers of the Lower Mainland
New Westminster Land District